"Clown in Your Rodeo" is a song written by Wayne Kirkpatrick, and recorded by American country music artist Kathy Mattea.  It was released in April 1995 as the fourth single from the album Walking Away a Winner.  The song reached #20 on the Billboard Hot Country Singles & Tracks chart.

Chart performance

References

1995 singles
Kathy Mattea songs
Songs written by Wayne Kirkpatrick
Song recordings produced by Josh Leo
Mercury Nashville singles
1994 songs